National Road 30 (abbreviated as EO30) is a single carriageway road in central Greece.  It connects the cities of Arta and Volos, via Trikala and Karditsa.

Route
The western end of the Greek National Road 30 is in Arta, where it is connected with GR-5. It runs northeast through the sparsely populated Athamanika mountains, until it reaches the town Pyli, where it enters the Thessalian Plain. At Trikala it connects with the GR-6, and turn southeast towards Karditsa, where it turns east. The section between Neo Monastiri and Farsala is shared with the GR-3. The Motorway 1 is crossed at Mikrothives. At Nea Anchialos the GR-30 reaches the coast of the Pagasetic Gulf. The GR-30 ends in the centre of Volos.Near Vourgareli there are 2 tunnels (cut&cover 400m. before Scala Scorliga tunnel) and Scala Scorliga tunnel 1200m. opened in 1981.

National Road 30 passes through the following places:
Arta
Peta
Vourgareli
Mesochora
Pyli
Trikala
Agnantero
Karditsa
Sofades
Neo Monastiri
Farsala
Mikrothives
Nea Anchialos
Volos

30
Roads in Epirus (region)
Roads in Thessaly